Kibwezi West is a constituency in Kenya. It is one of six constituencies in Makueni County.

Its current Member of Parliament is Dr. Patrick Musimba MP, who was first elected in March 2013 as an independent candidate.

References 

Constituencies in Makueni County